Timbwama Chisenga (born October 28, 1989) better known as Tim Thugga or now just Tim is a Zambian gospel rapper and songwriter. He rose to prominence as a member of the boy group Zone Fam formed in 2009 after they were all signed to Slam Dunk Records. While in Zone Fam, Tim began to establish himself as a solo artist until April 1, 2015, when he officially announced his plans to be a gospel artist on his social media.  His first single as a solo Christian hip hop artist, "Heartbeat" (produced by Mag44), was released in 2017 off his debut album TIM (This Is Music), set to be released in 2021.

Discography 
 October 28 2010 (Mixtape)
 Hypnosis EP 2013
 This is Music TBA

References

Living people
21st-century Zambian male singers
1989 births
People from Lusaka